Namti "နမ္မတီး" (also spelled "Nammati" and "Nanmati") is a town in Mogaung Township in Mohnyin District in the Kachin State of north-eastern Burma. Namti is 6 miles from Mogaung and 25 miles from Myitkyina.

The main ethnic groups living in the town are Kachin, Shan, Khamti,  Burmese and Gurkhas. There are also a few Chinese and Indian residents.

References

External links
Satellite map at Maplandia.com

Populated places in Kachin State